Gotha II is an electoral constituency (German: Wahlkreis) represented in the Landtag of Thuringia. It elects one member via first-past-the-post voting. Under the current constituency numbering system, it is designated as constituency 15. It covers the central part of the district of Gotha, around the city of Gotha.

Gotha II was created in 1990 for the first state election. Since 2009, it has been represented by Matthias Hey of the Social Democratic Party (SPD).

Geography
As of the 2019 state election, Gotha II covers the central part of the district of Gotha, around the city of Gotha. It comprises just two municipalities: Gotha and Hörsel.

Members
The constituency was held by the Christian Democratic Union from its creation in 1990 until 2009, during which time it was represented by Josef Duchac (1990–1994), Johanna Köhler (1994–1999), and Evelin Groß (1999–2009). It was won by the Social Democratic Party in 2009, and was represented by Matthias Hey. He was re-elected in 2014 and 2019.

Election results

2019 election

2014 election

2009 election

2004 election

1999 election

1994 election

1990 election

References

Electoral districts in Thuringia
1990 establishments in Germany
Gotha (district)
Gotha
Constituencies established in 1990